The Kinta District is a district in Perak, Malaysia. It contains the state capital Ipoh.

History
Kinta District was once famous for its tin, being one of the major tin producers in the 18th century.

Administrative divisions

Kinta District is divided into 5 mukims, which are:
 Belanja
 Sungai Terap (Batu Gajah town)
 Sungai Raia (including Simpang Pulai)
 Tanjung Tualang
 Hulu Kinta (including much of Ipoh's urban area)

Government
Kinta District is divided into two major councils:
Ipoh City Council , based in Ipoh, the state capital of Perak
Batu Gajah District Council, based in the town of Batu Gajah

The district and land officer also divided into Ipoh and Batu Gajah, and the Kinta District Office is centered at Batu Gajah.

Demographics 
The following is based on Department of Statistics Malaysia 2020 census.

Federal Parliament and State Assembly Seats 

List of Kinta district representatives in the Federal Parliament (Dewan Rakyat)

List of Kinta district representatives in the State Legislative Assembly of Perak

See also

 Districts of Malaysia

References